Organizations designated as terrorist by Bahrain are organizations that have been designated by the Bahrain government as terrorist organisations. The Ministry of Foreign Affairs maintains a public list of designated terrorist individuals and entities.

List 

 the list of designates 95 entities as terrorist:

See also 
 List of designated terrorist groups

References 

 
Terrorism in Bahrain